Christopher Ross Wilson (born June 7, 1977) is an American professional mixed martial arts fighter who last competed in 2013. A professional competitor since 2002, Wilson has formerly competed for the UFC, the IFL, and King of the Cage.

Mixed martial arts career

Early career
Wilson made his professional mixed martial arts debut on December 13, 2003, when he faced Elder Pyatt at Rumble at the Roseland 10. He won his debut via KO punch, ten seconds into the first round.

Following this impressive win, Wilson would compile a record of 15–4 (1), with notable victories in the International Fight League (IFL) over Jay Hieron, Pat Healy, and Rory Markham before signing with UFC in early 2008.

Ultimate Fighting Championship
Wilson made his UFC debut against Jon Fitch at UFC 82 on March 1, 2008. He lost the fight via unanimous decision. Wilson was then expected to face Steve Bruno at UFC 86 on July 5, 2008, however, the fight was rescheduled and instead took place at UFC 87 on August 9, 2008. He won the fight via unanimous decision.

In his third fight in the promotion, Wilson faced promotional newcomer John Howard at UFC 94 on January 31, 2009. Wilson lost the fight via split decision, putting his record at 1–2 in the promotion.

He then faced Mike Pyle at UFC Fight Night 19 on September 16, 2009. He lost the fight via guillotine choke submission, and was subsequently released from the promotion.

Post-UFC career
In his first fight since his UFC release, Wilson faced Keith Wisniewski at HFC 7: Validation on April 9, 2011. He lost the fight via unanimous decision.

Wilson then faced Wellington Oliveira at Brazilian FC: Desafio dos Imortais on December 16, 2011, defeating Oliveira via rear-naked choke.

He faced Irwing Machado at Brazilian FC 3: Lutadores Imortais on August 11, 2012. Wilson won the fight via D'arce choke in the first round. In his next fight, Wilson faced Leandro Silva at Predador FC 23 on March 9, 2013. He lost the fight via split decision.

Wilson faced Walmir Lazaro at Shooto Brazil 42 on August 25, 2013. He lost the fight via KO (punch).

Personal life
Chris and his wife have three children, two sons and a daughter. Currently, he lives in Ribeirão Preto, Brazil.

Mixed martial arts record

|-
|Loss
|align=center|18–10 (1)
|Walmir Lazaro
|KO (punch)
|Shooto Brazil 42
|
|align=center| 2
|align=center| 4:38
|Rio de Janeiro, Brazil
|
|-
|Loss
|align=center|18–9 (1)
|  Leandro Silva
|Decision (split)
|Predador FC 23
|
|align=center| 3
|align=center| 5:00
|Sao Paulo, Brazil
|Return to Lightweight.
|-
|Win
|align=center|18–8 (1)
|  Irwing Machado
| Submission (D'arce choke)
| Brazilian Fighting Championship 3: Lutadores Imortais
|
|align=center| 1
|align=center| 1:25
|Ribeirão Preto, São Paulo, Brazil
| 
|-
|Win
|align=center|17–8 (1)
|  Wellington Oliveira
| Submission (rear-naked choke)
| Brazilian Fighting Championship: Desafio dos Imortais
|
|align=center| 1
|align=center| 4:22
|Ribeirão Preto, São Paulo, Brazil
| 
|-
|Loss
|align=center|16–8 (1)
|  Keith Wisniewski
| Decision (unanimous)
| HFC 7: Validation
|
|align=center| 3
|align=center| 5:00
|Valparaiso, Indiana, United States
| 
|-
|Loss
|align=center|16–7 (1)
|  Mike Pyle
| Submission (guillotine choke)
| UFC Fight Night 19
|
|align=center|3
|align=center|2:15
|Oklahoma City, Oklahoma, United States
|
|-
|Loss
|align=center|16–6 (1)
|  John Howard
| Decision (split)
| UFC 94
|
|align=center|3
|align=center|5:00
|Las Vegas, Nevada, United States
|
|-
|Win
|align=center|16–5 (1)
|  Steve Bruno
| Decision (unanimous)
| UFC 87
|
|align=center|3
|align=center|5:00
|Minneapolis, Minnesota, United States
|
|-
|Loss
|align=center|15–5 (1)
|  Jon Fitch
| Decision (unanimous)
| UFC 82
|
|align=center|3
|align=center|5:00
|Columbus, Ohio, United States
|
|-
|Win
|align=center|15–4 (1)
|  Derrick Noble
| Decision (unanimous)
| SportFight 20: Homecoming
|
|align=center|3
|align=center|5:00
|Portland, Oregon, United States
|
|-
|Win
|align=center|14–4 (1)
|  Ray Steinbeiss
| Submission (armbar)
| BodogFIGHT: Vancouver
| 
|align=center|2
|align=center|4:00
|Vancouver, British Columbia, Canada
|
|-
|Win
|align=center|13–4 (1)
|  Rory Markham
| TKO (punches)
| IFL: Championship Final
|
|align=center|1
|align=center|2:14
|Uncasville, Connecticut, United States
|
|-
|Win
|align=center|12–4 (1)
|  Jay Hieron
| Decision (unanimous)
| IFL: World Championship Semifinals
| 
|align=center|3
|align=center|4:00
|Portland, Oregon, United States
|
|-
|Loss
|align=center|11–4 (1)
|  Brad Blackburn
| Decision (unanimous)
| IFL: Portland
| 
|align=center|3
|align=center|4:00
|Portland, Oregon, United States
|
|-
|Win
|align=center|11–3 (1)
|  LaVerne Clark
| Submission (triangle choke)
| SportFight 17: Hot Zone
|
|align=center|3
|align=center|3:51
|Portland, Oregon, United States
|
|-
|Loss
|align=center|10–3 (1)
|  Nick Thompson
| Submission (kimura)
| AFC 17: Absolute Fighting Championships 17
|
|align=center|2
|align=center|2:08
|Fort Lauderdale, Florida, United States
|
|-
|Win
|align=center|10–2 (1)
|  Pat Healy
| KO (knee)
| SportFight 14: Resolution
| 
|align=center|1
|align=center|1:28
|Portland, Oregon, United States
|
|-
|Win
|align=center|9–2 (1)
|  Cruz Chacon
| Submission (triangle choke)
| KOTC: Conquest
|
|align=center|2
|align=center|2:43
|Calgary, Alberta, Canada
|
|-
|Win
|align=center|8–2 (1)
|  Dave Garcia
| Submission (triangle choke)
| FFC 15: Fiesta Las Vegas
|
|align=center|1
|align=center|1:49
|Las Vegas, Nevada, United States
|
|-
|Win
|align=center|7–2 (1)
|  Brandon Melendez
| KO (punch)
| SportFight 10: Mayhem
|
|align=center|1
|align=center|2:30
|Gresham, Oregon, United States
|
|-
|Win
|align=center|6–2 (1)
|  Jerome Isaacs
| Submission (triangle choke)
| XFC: Dome of Destruction 2
|
|align=center|1
|align=center|0:57
|Tacoma, Washington, United States
|
|-
|Win
|align=center|5–2 (1)
|  Damian Hatch
| TKO (punches)
| SportFight 4: Fight For Freedom
|
|align=center|3
|align=center|1:55
|Gresham, Oregon, United States
|
|-
|Loss
|align=center|4–2 (1)
|  Eddy Ellis
| Decision (unanimous)
| SF 4: Fight For Freedom
|
|align=center|3
|align=center|5:00
|Gresham, Oregon, United States
|
|-
| NC
|align=center|4–1 (1)
|  Stale Nyang
| No Contest
| EVT 3: Inferno
|
|align=center|N/A
|align=center|N/A
|Copenhagen, Denmark
|
|-
|Loss
|align=center|4–1
|  Cam Ward
| Decision (split)
| SF 2: On the Move
|
|align=center|3
|align=center|5:00
|Portland, Oregon, United States
|
|-
|Win
|align=center|4–0
|  Scott Poyer
| TKO (punches)
| SF 1: Revolution
|
|align=center|1
|align=center|0:16
|Lynnwood, Washington, United States
|
|-
|Win
|align=center|3–0
|  Chris Young
| Submission (triangle choke)
| UFCF: Night of Champions
|
|align=center|1
|align=center|1:03
|Lynnwood, Washington, United States
|
|-
|Win
|align=center|2–0
|  Joey Rubio
| TKO (punches)
| PPKA: Ultimate Fight Night 3
|
|align=center|2
|align=center|1:37
|Yakima, Washington, United States
|
|-
|Win
|align=center|1–0
|  Elder Pyatt
| KO (punch)
| FCFF: Rumble at the Roseland 10
|
|align=center|1
|align=center|0:10
|Portland, Oregon, United States
|

References

External links
 Official Website
 
 
 Chris Wilson from UFC Fans

Living people
1977 births
American male mixed martial artists
Lightweight mixed martial artists
Welterweight mixed martial artists
Mixed martial artists utilizing Brazilian jiu-jitsu
American practitioners of Brazilian jiu-jitsu
People awarded a black belt in Brazilian jiu-jitsu
Mixed martial artists from Oregon
Sportspeople from Portland, Oregon
Ultimate Fighting Championship male fighters